Jimmy Means Racing is an American professional stock car racing team that competes in the NASCAR Xfinity Series, fielding the No. 52 Chevrolet Camaro part-time for Harrison Rhodes, Gar Robinson, and Brennan Poole. It is owned by former driver Jimmy Means, who was the team's primary driver upon the team's founding in 1978 as a Winston Cup team known as Means Racing.

History

Cup Series
After 44 starts driving for Bill Gray (and one for Rod Osterlund), Means made his debut as an owner in 1978 when he fielded the No. 52 Chevrolet. He had two top-tens and finished sixteenth in points. He expanded to a multi-car team briefly, fielding the No. 25 for Charlie Chamblee at Nashville and No.45 Atlanta, the No. 53 for Cecil Gordon at North Wilkesboro Speedway, and the No. 50 for Baxter Price at Texas World Speedway. His best years driving his car were from 1980 to 1983, when he finished no worse than 18th in the standings and had an average finish of 20th or better in all 4 seasons.

While remaining the primary driver of his car, in 1983, he stepped aside for Lennie Pond at Michigan International Speedway, who finished 22nd. In 1984, Means was injured and was replaced by Dale Jarrett, Sterling Marlin, Morgan Shepherd, Roy Smith and Bobby Wawak, and Means drove the No. 52 solely for the next six years. In 1991, Means gave up the No. 52 on two occasions; Bobby Hillin Jr. drove at Dover and Sears Point (finishing 19th and 21st), and Mike Wallace (finishing 31st and 39th) at Phoenix and Atlanta. In the early 1990s he frequently handed the wheel over to other drivers, including Hillin Jr, road racing ace Tommy Kendall; future IRL champion Scott Sharp; and future Craftsman Truck Series champ Mike Skinner. He also fielded occasional second entries for other drivers, including John McFadden, Mike Potter, and Brad Teague.

Means secured new sponsorship from NAPA for the 1993 season, but he was injured at Daytona. His temporary replacement was new NASCAR Rookie of the Year Jimmy Hensley. Means returned to finish 22nd at Atlanta. In what proved to be his final year as a driver, he was later 16th in the spring race at Bristol, 18th in Bristol's fall race, and 17th at Dover in September before his final race at Rockingham that fall. Besides Means' performances, the team's best result was 25th at Rockingham in February by Hensley. In 1994, the team's primary driver was Brad Teague, whose best finish in 8 starts was 22nd at Bristol in the summer. 4 other drivers competed once each in the No. 52 NAPA Ford in 1994. Mike Skinner finished 31st at Rockingham in February, Kirk Shelmerdine (former crew chief for Dale Earnhardt) was 26th at Talladega in May, Bob Keselowski was 41st at Pocono in June, and Gary Bradberry came home 30th in the season-ending Hooters 500 at Atlanta. In 1995, NAPA moved to the new NASCAR SuperTruck Series to sponsor Ron Hornaday Jr. and therefore did not return to sponsor Means Racing. The team picked up some sponsorship from Advance Communications/Race Page, but failed to qualify in all of their attempts with Bradberry, Teague, and Randy MacDonald sharing the car. The team attempted every race to start the year but then scaled back to part-time after the numerous DNQs, only running at the fall Darlington race with Teague, but again failing to make the field. The team closed down in 1996.

In 2012, the team announced that they would be returning to the Cup Series for the first time since 1995, fielding the No. 52 Toyota part-time for Scott Speed and Mike Skinner in a partnership with Dell Hamilton, running as Hamilton Means Racing. After many problems acquiring equipment and preparing cars, Speed attempted Martinsville but didn't qualify. The team made their debut at Darlington. The team picked up some sponsorship from Crusader Staffing. Skinner started and parked the car in their first race after 20 laps. Skinner tried again at Kentucky but did not qualify. In 2013, Means sold his owner points to Brian Keselowski Motorsports.

Xfinity Series

Car No. 52 history
In 2001, Means Racing returned to NASCAR in the Busch Series with a partnership with Moy Racing. They began the season with Jason Rudd, who ran the first race for the team, and Brad Teague, who ran five races total for them that season, his best finish a 38th at Watkins Glen International. Gaylord also returned to run two races, both resulting in 42nd-place finishes. Kertus Davis, Ricky Sanders and Andy Kirby also drove for the team that year. In 2002, Teague drove eleven races for the team, his best finish 38th at Nazareth Speedway. Jimmy Kitchens, Phil Bonifield and Eric Jones drove part-time as well for the team that year. Teague made 11 starts for Means in 2003, with Donnie Neuenberger running an additional two races.

In 2004, Bruce Bechtel joined as another driver to the team. He made several attempts but only made one race, at Pikes Peak. Teague continued to run with the team, his best finish being a 26th at Bristol. The next season, Shane Hall was the team's original driver but was soon released. Eric McClure began running with the team, with a best finish of 30th at Texas Motor Speedway, but was released in favor of Neuenberger. At the Dover 200, Neuenberger flipped over the Plan B Technologies Ford Taurus on Lap 2. He was uninjured, but as that was the team's only car, the team did not run again for a year.

The No. 52 returned for the 2007 Orbitz 300 at Daytona but failed to qualify with Brad Teague at the wheel. Teague, Neuenberger, Kevin Lepage, Jamie Mosley and Ian Henderson had driven throughout the season, with Scott Gaylord driving at Montreal, Phoenix, and Watkins Glen. Chris Lawson attempted but did not qualify at Memphis. Neuenberger drove four races with Royal Farms' sponsorship.

Derrike Cope was the team's driver for the first part of 2008 season. At the Diamond Hill Plywood 200 at Darlington, Cope was replaced by Brad Teague. Teague finished 22nd, 4 laps down. Teague mostly drove the car in 2008, but Neuenberger sometimes raced with Lepage, Scott Gaylord, Tony Raines and Boris Said occasionally drove. The 2009 season in the nationwide series was up and down for Means racing, with very many drivers. They were a "start and park" operation and missed several races.

For 2011, they returned to the Nationwide Series full-time in the No. 52 Chevy. Target Your Market Promotions and My 3 Sons Vending sponsored the team numerous times and continued to do so, off and on throughout the year. After Bobby Santos III took a hard hit during practice for the season opener in Daytona, Dale Earnhardt Jr. gave the team the No. 88 backup car, on the condition that Means Racing would run the whole race with the car, and not Start and Park. Means Racing did run the whole race, they would end up finishing 17th. Since Daytona, the team has run with several other drivers, including Daryl Harr, Tim Schendel, and Tony Raines.

For 2012, the team ran Daytona with driver former Cup driver Reed Sorenson, and then switched between drivers Tim Schendel, Kevin Lepage, Joey Gase, Justin Jennings and Ryan Ellis for one race. The team achieved a spot in the top-30, locking them into the first five races. The team's best finish was a 19th at Kansas with Gase.

In 2013, the No. 52 team mainly used driver Gase, for 18 total races. Means also used Donnie Neuenberger, Lepage, Schendel and Ellis each for one race. The year's best finish was also 19th, but this time at Talladega with driver Neuenberger. Toyotas were driven for 7 of the 22 races with Chevrolet cars used the other races.

In 2014, Gase again served as the team's primary driver with a high finish of 11th at Talladega. Sponsors included Donate Life, DB Sales Company, and ASC.

In 2015, the team returned with Gase. At Talladega, Gase earned his first top 5 finish by finishing 5th and earned the team their first top 5 finish.

In 2016, they returned with Gase. At Talladega, Gase was involved in a hard crash with Chris Cockrum. He collected a best finish of 19th at Daytona (June). He finished again 21st in the standings.

In 2017, Gase started on a high note a 7th-place finish at Daytona.

In 2018, Gase left JMR and moved to the Go Green/SS-Green Light Racing No. 35 car. The team would sign David Starr to replace him for the full season. He started the season with a 17th-place finish in the season-opener at Daytona. Starr continued to drive for the team in 2019.

Starr left for JD Motorsports in 2020 and was replaced by Kody Vanderwal, who ran all but the first three races of the season, which were run by J. J. Yeley. Due to the team needing more sponsorship, which Vanderwal did not bring to the team, he did not return in 2021.

In 2021 NASCAR Xfinity Series, Gray Gaulding, who brought his own sponsorship to the team, would replace Vanderwal in the No. 52. Gaulding entered 21 races and he failed to qualify 4 races. Gase would return with the team at Pocono, Talladega, Texas, Kansas, and season finale at Phoenix. At Talladega, the team fields a Ford that is owned by Gase himself instead of their usual Chevrolet. Gase failed to qualify at Phoenix. Spencer Boyd drove for the team at New Hampshire, Daytona, Charlotte Roval, and Martinsville. Dave Smith made starts with the team at Watkins Glen. Japanese driver Akinori Ogata drove for the team at Richmond. At Vegas, JMR lent their owner points to Rick Ware Racing so they could field a second car for Carson Ware.

In 2022, Harrison Rhodes drove the No. 52 at Daytona, as well as the three west coast races at Auto Club, Las Vegas and Phoenix. The team ended up skipping the west coast swing due to a lack of sponsorship but returned at Atlanta. Gar Robinson would drive the No. 52 at Circuit of the Americas, but did not qualify. Rhodes returned for the races at Richmond, where he did not qualify, and Martinsville, which they did not qualify as well. Means' 52 team did not attempt a race until they had subsequent sponsorship. The team returned at Bristol with Brennan Poole, but they did not qualify by just 0.023 seconds. Poole returned again at Charlotte Roval, but once again, they did not qualify.

Car No. 52 results

Car No. 53 history
In 2019, Jimmy Means Racing fielded the No. 53 car, which was fielded for Max Tullman at Mid-Ohio and Kyle Weatherman at Dover in October. The car did not attempt any races in 2020.

Car No. 53 results

Car No. 55 history
Jimmy Means Racing fielded the No. 55 car in 2008 as a backup for the 52. Brad Teague and Scott Gaylord raced for this team at Nashville and Phoenix respectively. Teague would also race this car at Dover. Chad Chaffin attempted to race at Milwaukee but didn’t qualify. Teague then attempted Bristol in 2009 with this car but did not qualify.

Car No. 55 results

Car No. 79 history

For multiple races in 2014, Jimmy Means Racing fielded a second car, the No. 79, which was a late entry/field filler team for races to have a full 40-car field. The car is the backup car from No. 52 but renumbered. Carl Long, Tim Schendel and John Jackson all drove one race each and start and parked.

In 2015, the No. 79 returned to complete the 40-car field five times. Matt Frahm drove for two races, Ryan Ellis, Zachary Bruenger and John Jackson all drove one race each. They start and parked all of them.

In 2016, the team returned to complete the 40-car field. Josh Williams drove at Michigan.

After the No. 79 did not attempt any races in 2017, the car did return once in 2018 with Josh Reaume driving it at Kentucky.

Car No. 79 results

References

External links
Jimmy Means Owner Statistics

Companies based in North Carolina
NASCAR teams